Sequah Medicine Company began in 1887 as the Sequah Medicine Co Ltd selling patent medicines such as prairie flower and Indian oil using traveling salesman, known as Sequahs.  The traveling salesmen were quack doctors. The original Sequah was William Henry Hartley, who founded the company selling supposed Native American remedies in Great Britain and Ireland. The successful pitch quickly drew imitators, to the annoyance of Hartley. One such example is Peter Alexander Gordon, who went under the pseudonym James Kaspar.  Gordon sold the Sequah Patent Medicine in Great Britain, Ireland, the West Indies and North America and South Africa.

Sequah products were sold using the device of a traveling medicine show.  These shows consisted of a warm-up act of music and other entertainments which attracted a crowd in order for the traveling salesman to begin his pitch.  The British version, introduced in 1890, was made up of a fairground steam organ.  The Government soon declared the practice of selling patent medicines in such a fashion illegal.  The company went into liquidation in 1895 and was liquidated on March 26, 1909.

References 

Pharmaceutical companies established in 1887
Pharmaceutical companies disestablished in 1909
Patent medicines
1887 establishments in England
1909 disestablishments in England
British companies disestablished in 1909
British companies established in 1887